James M. McCracken was a Massachusetts politician.

McCracken represented Dedham, Needham and Wellesley, Massachusetts in the Massachusetts House of Representatives.

See also
 1933–1934 Massachusetts legislature
 1935–1936 Massachusetts legislature

References

Members of the Massachusetts House of Representatives
Politicians from Needham, Massachusetts
Year of birth missing
Year of death missing